Alxasava (also, Alxasova, Alxasoba, Alkhasava Pervoye, and Birindzhi-Alkhasova) is a village and municipality in the Goychay Rayon of Azerbaijan.  It has a population of 780.

References 

Populated places in Goychay District